The BBL All-Star Game is the annual All-Star Game of the German first division basketball league, the Basketball Bundesliga (BBL). The event is based on the original NBA concept, and includes a slam dunk contest and a three-point shootout. Since 2012, the All-Star Game is played between "Team National" (domestic players) and "Team International" (foreign players).

Games

2012–present: National – International

1987–2011

Dunking & Three-point champions

See also
 Basketball in Germany
 German Basketball League
 German Basketball League Champions
 German Basketball League Awards
 German Basketball Cup
 German Basketball Supercup

References

External links
German League official website 

All-Star Game
BBL